Gunhild Bentzen Følstad (born 3 November 1981) is a Norwegian former football defender from Overhalla near Namsos. The daughter of a football trainer, she played for Trondheims-Ørn and the Norway women's national football team, making 76 appearances.  She is a qualified physiotherapist and her hobbies are skiing, reading and music.

Følstad captained Norway in one match against China in the Four-Nations Tournament in Guangzhou in January 2006.  In a match played in pouring rain China won 3-1.

She played as a central defender for her club and was a strong, quick and reliable player who played equally well at right- or left-back in the national team.  Her throw-in to the six-yard box from the sideline was a useful weapon.

At the 2007 Women's World Cup in China in September 2007 Følstad played in matches watched by 50,000 spectators.  Norway finished the tournament in 4th place.

On 9 June 2008 she was named to the Norwegian roster for the 2008 Summer Olympics to be held in Beijing, China.  On 6 August 2008, as a left-back in an attacking position, she provided the pass for the 1–0 goal by Leni Larsen Kaurin in Norway's 2–0 defeat of the United States in Qinhuangdao, which was then the quickest goal in the history of the tournament.  The team reached the quarter finals where they lost to Brazil.

Gunhild Følstad announced her retirement from football at the end of 2008 to pursue her career as a physiotherapist in Namsos.  Her partner is Hallvard Wågheim; their first child, a son, was born in Skage on 16 May 2010.

International goals
Scores and results list Norway's goal tally first.

References

External links
 
 
 
 
 
 
 

1981 births
Living people
Norwegian women's footballers
Norway women's international footballers
SK Trondheims-Ørn players
Toppserien players
Olympic footballers of Norway
Footballers at the 2008 Summer Olympics
2003 FIFA Women's World Cup players
2007 FIFA Women's World Cup players
Women's association football defenders
People from Namsos
People from Overhalla
Sportspeople from Trøndelag
21st-century Norwegian women